State Route 358 (SR 358) is a  west–east state highway located entirely in the southeastern part of Twiggs County in the central part of the U.S. state of Georgia. It is mainly a rural route. The highway was built along its current alignment between 1963 and 1966.

Route description
SR 358 begins at an intersection with SR 96 south-southeast of Jeffersonville. The route travels to the east-northeast along Homer Chance Highway to an interchange with Interstate 16 (I-16) just east of its midpoint. It continues to the east-northeast and meets its eastern terminus, an intersection with US 80/SR 19 west of Danville.

SR 358 is not part of the National Highway System, a system of roadways important to the nation's economy, defense, and mobility.

History
SR 358 was built, and paved, along its current alignment between 1963 and 1966.

Major intersections

See also

References

External links

 Georgia Roads (Routes 341 - 360)

358
Transportation in Twiggs County, Georgia